Plélan-le-Grand is a commune in the Ille-et-Vilaine department of Brittany in northwestern France.

Population
Inhabitants of Plélan-le-Grand are called Plélanais in French.

See also
Communes of the Ille-et-Vilaine department
Jean-Marie Valentin

References

External links

Official website Plélan-le-Grand 

Mayors of Ille-et-Vilaine Association 

Communes of Ille-et-Vilaine